Megalochelys ("great turtle") is an extinct genus of cryptodiran tortoises that lived from the Miocene to Pleistocene. They are noted for their giant size, which is among the largest of any known testudine, with a maximum carapace length  over 2 m (6.5 ft) in M. atlas. During the dry glacial periods it ranged from western India and Pakistan (possibly even as far west as southern and eastern Europe) to as far east as Sulawesi and Timor in Indonesia, though the island specimens likely represent distinct species.

Description 
M. atlas is thus the largest known tortoise. The only larger turtles were the marine Archelon and Protostega from the Cretaceous Period, and the aquatic, freshwater Stupendemys of the South American Late Miocene.

Like the modern Galápagos tortoise, M. atlas''' weight was supported by four elephantine feet. Like other tortoises, it is thought to have been herbivorous.

 Taxonomy Megalochelys is the original and valid name for what has been called Colossochelys. It contains three named species with several unnamed taxa.Megalochelys atlas Falconer and Cautley, 1844 Late Miocene to Early Pleistocene, India (Sivalik Hills), Myanmar, ?ThailandMegalochelys cautleyi Lydekker, 1889Lydekker, R. 1889. Catalogue of the Fossil Reptilia and Amphibia in the British Museum. Part III. Chelonia. London: British Museum of Natural History, 239 pp. Late Pliocene to Early Pleistocene, India (Sivalik Hills) probable nomen dubium.Megalochelys margae Early Pleistocene, Sulawesi, IndonesiaMegalochelys sondaari Karl and Staesche, 2007  Early Pleistocene (until 1.7 ma) Luzon, PhilippinesMegalochelys sp. Middle-Late Pleistocene (about 0.8-0.12 Mya) Timor, IndonesiaMegalochelys sp. Early Pleistocene (until 1.2 Mya) Java, IndonesiaMegalochelys sp. Early Pleistocene (until 0.9 Mya) Flores, Indonesia
Cladistic analysis has suggested that Megalochelys closest living relative is Centrochelys (the African spurred tortoise), with both also being closely related to Geochelone (the star tortoises).

 Extinction 
The genus is highly suspected to have gone extinct due to the arrival of Homo erectus, due to staggered extinctions on islands coinciding with the arrival of H. erectus in these regions, as well as evidence of exploitation by H. erectus. The genus was largely extinct by the end of the Early Pleistocene, but persisted on Timor into the Middle Pleistocene.

 See also 

 Stupendemys an extremely large freshwater turtle from the Miocene of South America, comparable in size to Megalochelys atlas''

References

Testudinidae
Pleistocene turtles
Miocene genus first appearances
Pleistocene genus extinctions
Pliocene turtles
Miocene turtles
Miocene reptiles of Asia
Pliocene reptiles of Asia
Pleistocene reptiles of Asia
Prehistoric turtle genera
Taxa named by Hugh Falconer
Taxa named by Proby Cautley
Fossil taxa described in 1837
Extinct turtles